Whitney is the second studio album by American singer Whitney Houston, released on June 2, 1987, by Arista Records as the follow-up to her debut album. The album features five top 10 hits on the US Billboard Hot 100, which also became international hits. The album's first four singles—"I Wanna Dance with Somebody (Who Loves Me)", "Didn't We Almost Have It All", "So Emotional" and "Where Do Broken Hearts Go"—all peaked at number one on the US Hot 100, making her the first female act to achieve four number-one hits from one album.

Along with three straight number one singles from Houston's previous album, this gave the singer an unprecedented seven consecutive number one hits, surpassing the Beatles and the Bee Gees, who each had six number one consecutive hits. None of Houston's seven consecutive number one singles were duets, and none were recorded with other major acts. The album Whitney also included the top-ten US hit "Love Will Save the Day".

The album and the first single, "I Wanna Dance with Somebody (Who Loves Me)", were hits worldwide, peaking at number one in the United States, the United Kingdom, Canada, Australia, New Zealand, and several countries throughout Europe. It also became a major hit in various other countries in Asia, South America, and Africa. The album was a global success, and debuted at number one on the US Billboard Top 200 Album Chart on June 27, 1987. This made Houston the first female artist to ever debut at number one in the United States. The album remained at the top for eleven consecutive weeks, creating a record; the most cumulative weeks (25 weeks) at number one on the albums chart by a female artist during the 1980s.

At the 30th Grammy Awards, it received three nominations including Album of the Year, with Houston winning Best Pop Vocal Performance, Female for "I Wanna Dance with Somebody (Who Loves Me)". With sales of over 20 million copies worldwide, Whitney is one of the best-selling albums of all time. On October 28, 2020, the album was certified diamond by the Recording Industry Association of America, for sales of over 10 million copies.

Production 
The album had a more pop feel than the first album. Narada Michael Walden, who produced "How Will I Know" on the first album, produced seven of the Whitney album's eleven tracks, three of which became number ones on Billboards Hot 100 Singles chart in 1987 and 1988. Kashif, the producer of "You Give Good Love", contributed "Where You Are". Michael Masser, who was responsible for several hits from Whitney's debut album, contributed number 1 hit single "Didn't We Almost Have It All" and "You're Still My Man". Finally, Jellybean Benitez produced the top ten hit "Love Will Save the Day".

Promotion and appearances

Singles 
Whitney produced a then-record-equalling four number one singles from one album, making it the first album by a female artist, and overall only the second album by a solo artist, behind Michael Jackson's Bad, yielded five number ones. The album is one of only seven albums in music history to generate at least four number one Hot 100 hits from the same album. This feat, with the three number ones from her debut album, also gave Houston seven consecutive number one songs; a record for the most consecutive number ones by any musical act.  The most consecutive #1's title was previously held by both The Beatles and the Bee Gees with six each.

The first single released from the album, "I Wanna Dance with Somebody (Who Loves Me)", made its debut at number 38, her highest debut at the time, on the Billboard Hot 100 chart, the issue dated May 16, 1987, and reached the top position in six weeks later, becoming her fourth number one hit. It also topped the Hot Adult Contemporary chart for three weeks. The single was a massive success globally, becoming one of her signature songs. In the United Kingdom, it entered the UK Singles Chart at number 10 on May 23, 1987, and reached the number one in two weeks later, staying there for two weeks. According to the Official Charts Company, it sold 760,000 copies and became her best-selling single in the country at the point. The single also peaked at number one of the singles charts in Australia for five weeks, Belgium for three weeks, Canada for a week, Germany for five weeks, Italy for one week, the Netherlands for four weeks, New Zealand for four weeks, Norway for seven weeks, Sweden for six weeks, and Switzerland for six weeks. Thanks to its strong sales and airplay across Europe, it went to top position of European Hot 100 Singles chart and remained at the summit for eight weeks. The single was certified Gold^ by the RIAA on July 28, 1987, for sales of one million more in the United States―the requirement for a Gold single prior to 1989, and re-certified Platinum for the same sales on February 13, 1989. In addition, it was certified Gold in the UK, Canada, and Sweden. The single sold 4.2 million copies worldwide.

The power ballad, "Didn't We Almost Have It All", was released as the album's second single in August 1987. It peaked at number one on the Hot 100 chart on September 26, 1987, and stayed on the top for two weeks. It also topped the Hot Adult Contemporary chart for three weeks, becoming her fifth chart-topper. The single peaked at number two in Canada.

The album's third and fourth singles, "So Emotional" and "Where Do Broken Hearts Go", both reached number one on the Billboard Hot 100 Singles chart in 1988, becoming her sixth and seventh number one hits, respectively. The former became her second number one hit on Billboard Hot Dance/Club Play chart and was certified Gold for shipments of 500,000 copies by the RIAA on December 6, 1995. The latter peaked at number one Billboard Hot Adult Contemporary chart for three weeks.

The fifth single to be released off the album, "Love Will Save the Day", peaked at number nine on the Hot 100 Singles chart. All five singles were top 5 Hot Black Singles hits, though none of them reached number one. "I Know Him So Well" was released as the sixth and final single from the album exclusively in Australia, Germany, Netherlands, and Spain.

Note
^ It was a certification according to old criteria. In 1989, the sales thresholds for singles were reduced to 500,000 for Gold and 1,000,000 for Platinum, reflecting a decrease in sales of singles.

Critical reception 

Upon the album's debut, the critical receptions of Whitney were mixed. Most of critics admitted the commercial value of the album, but were critical because its standard pattern followed the predecessor's winning formula and the materials failed to reveal Houston's individuality. Jon Pareles of The New York Times criticized something as formulaic on the album, stating that: "Whitney plays everything safe. It uses three of the debut album's producers. [...] There are bouncy, tinkly songs aimed at teen-agers, [...] and slow tunes aimed at sentimental adults, as before. Even the album title fits in with an Arista Records custom of separating female singers—Dionne, Aretha, Carly—from their last names." He was not positive of her vocals on it, commenting "What's more unsettling is that in the two years since Whitney Houston was released, the singer hasn't gotten much more expressive. For too many songs, she takes the patched-together style of the debut album further [...] as if she were singing in a second language." He added that "For all the passionate avowals of the lyrics, Ms. Houston and her producers keep emotion at bay."

Vince Aletti from Rolling Stone also gave an unfavorable review, stating "the formula is more rigorously locked in than before, and the range so tightly circumscribed that Houston's potential seems to have shrunk rather than expanded" and the record is "smug, repressive and ridiculously safe." Also, he made some sarcastic comments about the first single, "I Wanna Dance with Somebody (Who Loves Me)", calling it "How Will I  spoken at Hollywood's blockbuster sequels. Robert Hilburn, in his review for Los Angeles Times, regarded the album as "another commercial blockbuster", writing that the record is "a series of highly accessible selections that will work on a variety of radio formats." However, he expressed his considerable disappointment that Whitney did precious little to define the singer's vision, adding that she had a sensational voice but didn't assert much vocal character on it. Dolores Barclay of The Associated Press complimented Houston on her vocal ability: "Whitney Houston has a fine instrument and uses it well. Her voice takes us to places we know and to places we might want to forget and to places we dream about." But she, like other critics, was critical of the song material on the record, commenting "There is no depth, and not much excitement. Nor does this talented song stylist and Grammy winner take risks and try something just a little daring." The St. Petersburg Times showed a favorable attitude toward her new album at large, stating "[Whitney] is, first and foremost, a product. It has been carefully designed, manufactured and packaged. As such, it's easy to be cynical about. But as products go, this is a pretty good one." They also praised her vocals: "Houston's voice sounds good, real good. [...] She's firmer, more confident."

Commercial performance 
With the highly anticipated release of her second album Whitney, Houston became the first female artist to debut at number one in the history of the Billboard 200 chart (formerly the "Top Pop Albums" chart). It made her the fourth artist to achieve that feat overall, behind Elton John with Captain Fantastic and the Brown Dirt Cowboy and Rock of the Westies, Stevie Wonder with Songs in the Key of Life and Bruce Springsteen & the E Street Band with Live/1975–85. On June 27, 1987, the album topped the chart and remained there for eleven consecutive weeks, the longest run among the releases that reached peak position of the year. It also debuted at number fourteen on the Top R&B/Hip-Hop Albums chart (formerly the "Top Black Albums" chart) and peaked at the number two, staying on the chart for a total of seventy-five weeks. The album was Houston's fastest-selling album in the United States at that time, with four million copies shipped within the first three months of its release. In 2020, it was certified Diamond (10× Platinum) in the US, for shipping/ selling over 10 million copies by the Recording Industry Association of America The album re-entered the Billboard 200 the week of February 25, 2012, after Houston's death, at number 122. It remained in the chart for 11 more weeks making 86 weeks on the Billboard 200 to date. The album has sold nearly 289,000 copies more since its reentry in 2012. It also sold 806,000 units at the BMG Music Club as of February 2003.

In the United Kingdom, the album debuted at number one on the UK Albums Chart on June 13, 1987, and remained there for six weeks. Whitney became the first album to debut at number one in both the US and in the UK. It was 1987's third best-.selling album in the UK, behind Michael Jackson's Bad and U2's The Joshua Tree, and was ranked number six on list of "The Best-Selling Albums of the 1980s in UK". With 1.2 million copies sold there, it would become the biggest selling album by a female artist in the UK, a record that has since been broken. With her debut also selling over a million copies, this would make Houston the first female artist to have two albums sell over a million copies in the UK. With current sales of over 2.2 million, the album was the first album by an African-American woman to sell over 2 million in the United Kingdom.

In Canada, the album topped the albums chart for eleven weeks. It remained at number one in the same weeks as it did in America. It being the third best-selling album in 1987, behind U2's The Joshua Tree and Bon Jovi's Slippery When Wet. In addition, it peaked at number one in Germany for eleven weeks, Italy for five weeks, Norway for eleven weeks, Netherlands for six weeks, Switzerland for eleven weeks, Austria for two weeks, Sweden for four weeks, Australia for three weeks, New Zealand for two weeks, Spain, Finland, Taiwan, and so on. As a result of massive popularity across Europe, the album topped the European Hot 100 Albums chart for eight weeks in 1987. In Japan, with sales of 384,000 copies combined of LP, CD and Compact Cassette, the album became the third best-selling international album of 1987, behind Top Gun Soundtrack Album and Michael Jackson's Bad. In 1988, Whitney was certified 6× Platinum by the British Phonographic Industry (BPI) and 7× Platinum for shipments of 700,000 copies of the album by the Canadian Recording Industry Association (CRIA), respectively. It was also certified Platinum in Germany, Netherlands and Finland, respectively, 2× Platinum in Switzerland, Austria and Sweden, respectively. In November 2006, Whitney was ranked number forty-seven for sales of 2.2 million, making it her biggest-selling album in the UK, on list of "100 Best Selling Albums of All Time in the UK" announced by The Official UK Charts Company. The album has sold over 20 million copies worldwide.

Track listing

Personnel 

"I Wanna Dance with Somebody (Who Loves Me)"1
Narada Michael Walden – drums
Walter Afanasieff – synthesizers
Randy Jackson – bass synth
Corrado Rustici – guitar synth
Preston Glass – percussion programming
Marc Russo – alto sax
Gigi Gonaway – electronic drums
Sterling – synth horns
Jim Gilstrap – background vocals
Kitty Beethoven – background vocals
Kevin Dorsey – background vocals
Myrna Matthews – background vocals
Jennifer Hall – background vocals
Whitney Houston – background vocals

"Just the Lonely Talking Again"1
Narada Michael Walden – "Brushes on the Kit of Life"
Frank Martin – DX7 Vibes, synthesizers
Corrado Rustici – guitar synth
Kenny G – tenor sax
Jim Gilstrap – background vocals
Kitty Beethoven – background vocals
Niki Haris – background vocals
Jennifer Hall – background vocals
Michael Gibbs – string arrangements, conducting

"Love Will Save the Day"2
Jellybean – drum programming
Linden Aaron – Simmons toms
Jack Waldman – synthesizers
Fred Zarr – synthesizers
Paul Jackson, Jr. – guitar
Roy Ayers – vibes
Paulinho da Costa – percussion
Bashiri Johnson – percussion
Sammy Figueroa – percussion
Whitney Houston – background vocals

"Didn't We Almost Have It All?"3
John Robinson – drums
Paul Jackson, Jr. – guitar
Nathan East – bass
Robbie Buchanan – Rhodes, acoustic piano, rhythm arrangement
Lee Holdridge – string arrangement

"So Emotional"1
Narada Michael Walden – drums
Walter Afanasieff – keyboards, synth bass
Corrado Rustici – guitar synth
Bongo Bob – percussion programming, drum sampling
Whitney Houston – background vocals

"Where You Are"4
Kashif, Ralph Schuckett – keyboards, synths
Kashif – programming, rhythm arrangement
Paul Leim – drums
Bashiri Johnson – percussion
Marcus Miller – bass
Dann Huff, Ira Siegel, Paul Pesco – guitar
Vincent Henry – sax solo
Gene Page – string and horn arrangements
Whitney Houston – background vocals
Kashif – background vocals

"Love Is a Contact Sport"1
Narada Michael Walden – drums
Preston Glass – keyboards, synth strings, percussion programming
Paul Leim – drums
Walter Afanasieff – DX7, Prophet 2002, Oberheim Matrix-12
Cory Lerios – Oberheim Xpander
Randy Jackson – electric bass
Corrado Rustici – guitar synth
Shambhu Neil Vineberg – acoustic guitar
Bongo Bob – percussion programming
Gigi Gonaway – Simmons, tambourine
Kenny G – tenor saxophone
Raul Rekou – congas
Jerry Hey – horn arrangements, horn section
Marc Russo – horn section
Wanye Wallace – horn section
Premik Russell Tubbs – horn section
Jim Gilstrap – background vocals
Kitty Beethoven – background vocals
Niki Haris – background vocals
Claytoven Richardson – background vocals
Jennifer Hall – background vocals

"You're Still My Man"3
Robbie Buchanan – Rhodes
Randy Kerber – acoustic piano
Nathan East – bass
Paul Jackson, Jr. – guitar
John Robinson – drums
Michael Boddicker – synths
Gene Page – string and rhythm arrangements

"For the Love of You"1
Narada Michael Walden – drum programming
Randy Jackson – Moog synthesizer
Paul Rekow – congas
Preston Glass – Linn, Roland 808
Frank Martin – DX7, Oberheim Matrix-12, birds
Kenny G – alto sax lyricon
Raul Rekou – congas
Whitney Houston – background vocals

"Where Do Broken Hearts Go?"1
Narada Michael Walden – drum programming
Frank Martin – piano, synths
Preston Glass – synth programming, bells
Randy Jackson – bass synth
Corrado Rustici – guitar synth
Gigi Gonaway – Simmons
Michael Gibbs – string arrangements, conductor
Jim Gilstrap – background vocals
Kitty Beethoven – background vocals
Niki Haris – background vocals
Jennifer Hall – background vocals

"I Know Him So Well"1
Narada Michael Walden – acoustic drums
Walter Afanasieff – Kurzweil, DX7, Super Jupiter
Preston Glass – DX7
Cory Lerios – synth
Randy Jackson – electric bass
Corrado Rustici – guitar synth
Michael Gibbs – string arrangements, conducting

1 Narada Michael Walden – producer, arranger
David Frazer – recording, mixing
Dana Jon Chappelle – assistant engineer
Lincoln Clapp – engineer
Gordon Lyon – engineer
Jay Rifkin – engineer
Ken Kessie – engineer
Maureen Droney – engineer
Additional assistant engineers – Gordon Lyon – assistant engineer
Stuart Hirotsu – assistant engineer
Paul "Goatee" Hamingson – assistant engineer
Noah Baron – assistant engineer
Bill "Sweet William" Miranda – assistant engineer
Ross Williams – assistant engineer
Rob Beaton – assistant engineer

2 Jellybean Benitez – producer
Jack Waldman – arranger
Toni C. - arranger
Michael Hutchinson – engineer
Doc Dougherty – engineer
Dennis McKay – engineer
Nick Delre – assistant engineer
Toni Greene – assistant engineer
Jay Healy – assistant engineer
Fernando Kral – assistant engineer
Tony Maserati – assistant engineer
Paul Pesce – assistant engineer
Don Peterkofsky – assistant engineer
Tim Reppert – assistant engineer
Mark Roule – assistant engineer
Craig Vogel – assistant engineer
Michael Hutchinson – mix engineer

3 Michael Masser – producer
Engineers – Michael DeLugg – engineer
Dean Burt – engineer
Jim Boyer – engineer
Mike Mancini – engineer
Russ Terrano – engineer
Fred Law – engineer
Fernando Kral – assistant engineer
Tony Maserati – assistant engineer
Russ Torrano – mixing engineer
Alicia Winfield – production coordinator

Design 
Richard Avedon – front cover and inner sleeve photography
Mark Larson – design
Bernard Maisner – hand lettering
Milton Sincoff – art production

4 Kashif – producer
Darroll Gustamachio – engineer
Russ Terrana, Calvin Harris
Larry Smith – assistant engineer
Dennis Mitchell – assistant engineer
Bob Loftus – assistant engineer
Steve MacMillan – assistant engineer
Mike Ross – assistant engineer
Mike Dotson – assistant engineer
Amy Ziffer – assistant engineer
Milton Chan – assistant engineer
John Drankchak – assistant engineer
Darroll Gustamachio – mix engineer
Russell Sidelsky – production coordinator
George Marino – mastering
Whitney Houston – vocal arrangements
Clive Davis – executive producer

Charts

Weekly charts

Year-end charts

Decade-end charts

All-time charts

Certifications and sales

Accolades

American Black Achievement Awards 

|-
| width="35" align="center"|1987 || Whitney Houston (herself) || The Music Award (shared with Luther Vandross) || 
|-
| align="center"|1988 || Whitney Houston (herself) || The Music Award || 
|-

American Music Awards 

|-
| rowspan="3" align="center"|1988 || Whitney Houston (herself) || Favorite Pop/Rock Female Artist || 
|-
|"I Wanna Dance with Somebody (Who Loves Me)" || Favorite Pop/Rock Single || 
|-
|Whitney Houston (herself) || Favorite Soul/R&B Female Artist || 
|-
| rowspan="2" align="center"|1989 || rowspan="2"|Whitney Houston (herself) || Favorite Pop/Rock Female Artist || 
|-
|Favorite Soul/R&B Female Artist || 
|-

Billboard Music Awards 
The Billboard Music Awards, based on Billboard magazine's year-end charts, was not held before 1990. Nominated categories were those of which were ranked in Top 5 on the year-end charts. This is based on general numbers of nomination at the Billboard Music Awards.

|-
| width="35" rowspan="9" align="center"|1987 || rowspan="3"|Whitney Houston (herself) || Top Pop Artist of the Year || 
|-
|Top Pop Albums Artist || 
|-
|Top Pop Singles Artist || 
|-
|"I Wanna Dance with Somebody (Who Loves Me)" || Top Pop Single || 
|-
| rowspan="2"|Whitney Houston (herself) || Top Pop Album Artist – Female || 
|-
|Top Pop Singles Artist – Female || 
|-
| "I Wanna Dance with Somebody (Who Loves Me)" || Top Hot Crossover Single || 
|-
| rowspan="2"|Whitney Houston (herself) || Top Hot Crossover Artist || 
|-
|Top Adult Contemporary Artist || 
|-
| align="center" rowspan="11"|1988 || rowspan="4"|Whitney Houston (herself) || Top Black Artist of the Year || 
|-
|Top Pop Singles Artist || 
|-
|Top Pop Album Artist – Female || 
|-
|Top Pop Singles Artist – Female || 
|-
|Whitney || Top Black Album || 
|-
||Whitney Houston (herself) || Top Black Album Artist || 
|-
|"So Emotional" (Remix) || Top Dance Club Play Single || 
|-
|Whitney Houston (herself) || Top Dance Club Play Artist || 
|-
|"Where Do Broken Hearts Go" || Top Adult Contemporary Single || 
|-
| rowspan="2"|Whitney Houston (herself) || Top Adult Contemporary Artist || 
|-
|Top Hot Crossover Artist || 
|-

BRAVO Magazine's Bravo Otto Awards 
BRAVO is the largest teen magazine within the German-language sphere. Since 1957, the magazine has distributed its "Bravo Otto" awards based on the readers' vote in different categories each year.

|-
|width="35" align="center"|1988 || Whitney Houston (herself) || Female Singer – Silver Otto Award || 
|-

BRIT Awards (formerly "BPI Awards") 

|-
| width="35" align="center"|1988 || Whitney Houston (herself) || Best International Solo Artist || 
|-
| align="center"|1989 || Whitney Houston (herself) || Best International Female Artist || 
|-

The Garden State Music Awards 

|-
|width="35" align="center" rowspan="7"|1988 || Whitney Houston (herself) || Best Female Vocalist, Rock/Pop || 
|-
|Whitney || Best Album, Rock/Pop || 
|-
|"So Emotional" || Best Single, Rock/Pop || 
|-
|Whitney Houston (herself) || Best Female Vocalist, R&B/Dance || 
|-
|Whitney || Best Album, R&B/Dance || 
|-
|"So Emotional" || Best Single, R&B/Dance || 
|-
|"I Wanna Dance with Somebody (Who Loves Me)" || Best Music Video || 
|-

Grammy Awards 

|-
|width="35" align="center" rowspan="4"|1988 || Whitney || Album of the Year || 
|-
|"I Wanna Dance with Somebody (Who Loves Me)" || Best Pop Vocal Performance, Female || 
|-
|"For the Love of You" || Best R&B Vocal Performance, Female || 
|-
|"Didn't We Almost Have It All" || Song of the Year (the songwriters: Michael Masser, Will Jennings) || 
|-

NAACP Image Awards 

|-
| width="35" align="center"|1987 || Whitney || Outstanding Female Recording Artist || 
|-

People's Choice Awards 

|-
| width="35" align="center"|1988 || Whitney Houston (herself) || Favorite Female Musical Performer || 
|-
|-
| align="center"|1989 || Whitney Houston (herself) || Favorite Female Musical Performer || 
|-

Recording Industry Association of America (RIAA) Awards

Soul Train Music Awards 

|-
|width="35" align="center" rowspan="2"|1988 || Whitney || Album of the Year, Female || 
|-
|"I Wanna Dance with Somebody (Who Loves Me)" || Best Music Video || 
|-
|align="center"|1989 || "Where Do Broken Hearts Go" || Best R&B/Urban Contemporary Single, Female || 
|-

Billboard Magazine Year-End Charts 
Categories in which Houston was ranked No. 1 were excluded. See above awards list for her #1-ranked-categories.

See also 
List of best-selling albums
List of best-selling albums by women
List of Top 25 albums for 1987 in Australia
List of number-one albums of 1987 (Finland) (in Finnish)

References

External links 
 Whitney – Whitney Houston
 Whitney at AllMusic
 Whitney at Discogs

Whitney Houston albums
1987 albums
Arista Records albums
Albums arranged by Gene Page
Albums arranged by Lee Holdridge
Albums produced by Narada Michael Walden
Albums produced by Michael Masser
Albums recorded at MSR Studios